Bangladesh is divided into 8 divisions (bibhag) and 64 districts (jela, zila, zela), although these have only a limited role in public policy. For the purposes of local government, the country is divided into upazilas (sub-districts), "municipalities" or town councils (pourashova), city corporations (i.e. metropolitan municipal corporations) and union councils (i.e. rural councils).
The diagram below outlines the five tiers of government in Bangladesh.

Regions
 
Traditionally Bangladesh is divided between four regions by the fertile Ganges-Brahmaputra delta; formed by the confluence of the Ganges (local name Padma or Pôdda), Brahmaputra (Jamuna or Jomuna), and Meghna rivers and their respective tributaries. 
 Northern Bengal: comprising Rajshahi Division and Rangpur Division.
 Eastern Bengal: also known as eastern Bangladesh, comprising Chittagong Division, Sylhet Division and proposed Comilla Division, known for the Surma-Meghna River System.
 Central Bengal: also known as Central Bengal Region, comprising Mymensingh Division and Dhaka Division, excluding proposed Faridpur Division.
 Southern Bengal: comprising Barisal Division, Khulna Division and proposed Faridpur Division.

Divisions

Bangladesh is divided into eight major administrative divisions. Each division is named after the major city within its jurisdiction that serves as the administrative capital of that division:
 Barishal
 Chattogram
 Dhaka
 Khulna
 Mymensingh
 Rajshahi
 Rangpur
 Sylhet

Proposed divisions
 Cumilla Division – proposed to consist six northwestern districts of the existing Chittagong Division.
 Faridpur Division – proposed to consist five southern districts of the existing Dhaka Division.

Districts

The divisions are divided into 64 districts. Each district is run by a Deputy Commissioner (popularly abbreviated to "DC") who is appointed by the government from a Deputy secretary of BCS Administration Cadre.

Upazilas

The districts are divided into sub-districts called upazilas. Upazilas are similar to the county subdivisions found in some Western countries. Bangladesh has 495 upazilas (as of 31 August 2021). The upazilas are the second lowest tier of regional administration in Bangladesh.  Like India, City corporations do not fit neatly into upazilas, despite some deemed as "sadar", indicating urban characteristics.

Upazilas were formerly known as thana which literally means police station. Despite the meaning, thanas functioned much as an administrative and geographic region, much as today's upazilas. In 1982 thanas were re-termed to as upazilas with provisions for semi-autonomous local governance. This system was reverted to the thana system in 1992. Later in 1999 geographic regions under administrations of thanas were converted into upazilas. All administrative terms in this level were renamed from thana to upazila. For instance, Thana Nirbahi Officer (lit. Thana Executive Officer) was renamed to  upazila Nirbahi Officer (lit. Upazila Executive Officer). The word thana is now used to solely refer to police stations. Generally, there is one police station for each upazila; but larger administrative units may have more than one police station covering different regions.

The upazila is administered by Upazila Nirbahi Officer (UNO) and upazila parishad. UNOs are Senior Assistant Secretary of Bangladesh Civil Service (BCS). Each upazila parishad (or council) has a chairman, a vice-chairman and a woman vice-chairman. All three are elected through direct popular election.

The sub-districts are further subdivided into 4,571 Rural Councils and  330 Town Councils or Paurasabha or Municipality.

Rural blocks, cities and towns

City corporations 

The cities with a city corporation, having mayoral elections, include Dhaka South, Dhaka North, Chittagong, Khulna, Sylhet, Rajshahi, Barisal, Rangpur, Comilla, Narayanganj, Mymensingh  and Gazipur.  The city corporation are divided into wards, which are further divided into mahallas. Direct elections are held for each ward, electing a councillor. The city mayors are elected for a span of five years.

Municipal corporations 

In the metropolitan areas, excluding the cities with city corporations, have municipal corporations, also known as Paurasabha. Paurasabhas are divided into wards, which are further divided into Mauzas and Mahallas. Direct elections are held for each ward, electing a chairperson and a number of members. The municipal heads are elected for a span of five years.

Union councils 

Union councils (or union parishads or unions) are the smallest rural administrative and local government units in Bangladesh. Each Union is made up of nine Wards. Usually one village is designated as a Ward. There are 4,571 Unions in Bangladesh. A Union Council consists of a chairman and twelve members including three members exclusively reserved for women. Union Parishads are formed under the Local Government (Union Parishads) Act, 2009. The boundary of each Union is demarcated by the Deputy Commissioner of the District. A Union Council is the body primarily responsible for agricultural, industrial and community development within the local limits of the union.

Lowest level elective units

Rural villages

City and municipal wards

Non–elective ceremonial units

Mahallas

Mouzas

Historical administrative divisions
 Chakla
 Mahakuma
 Pargana
 Sarkar
 Thanas

See also 
 Local government in Bangladesh

References 

 
Bangladesh